Elizabeth Boase (born 1963) is an Australian biblical scholar and the inaugural Dean of the School of Graduate Research at the University of Divinity in Melbourne. Boase uses a range of hermeneutical approaches in her work but is particularly known for her use of trauma theory as an hermeneutical lens to interpret the Bible. She also publishes in the areas of Hebrew Bible, the Book of Lamentations, the Book of Jeremiah, Biblical Hermeneutics, Bakhtin and the Bible, and Ecological Hermeneutics.

Biography 
Boase studied Applied Science (Speech and Hearing) at the Western Australia Institute of Technology, now known as Curtin University.  Following graduation, she worked as a speech therapist.  

She is a member of the Uniting Church of Australia, and at the age of 25 she was serving as an Elder in the church. She was commissioned as a lay preacher in 1994. 

She completed a Bachelor of Divinity (Honours) at Murdoch University in Perth. Studying part time while raising two children, she completed her doctoral studies at Murdoch University in 2003. Boase worked as a lecturer at the University of Notre Dame Australia in Fremantle from 2004 to 2008. She later worked at Uniting College for Leadership and Theology, in South Australia, where she was Lecturer of Old Testament and co-director of Biblical Studies.

Boase also taught at Adelaide College of Divinity, and Flinders University from 2009–2019. She became Head of the Theology Department at Flinders University and Academic Dean of the Adelaide College of Divinity. 

In February 2020, Boase began work as the inaugural Dean for the School of Graduate Research at the University of Divinity, in Melbourne.

Career and research 
Boase's first book explored the relationship between the Book of Lamentations, and prophetic literature in the Hebrew Bible.  A revision of her PhD thesis, The Fulfillment of Doom? The Dialogic Interaction between the Book of Lamentation and the Pre-Exilic/Early Exilic Prophetic Literature, was published in 2006 by T&T Clark, volume 437 in The Library of Hebrew Bible/Old Testament Studies series.  The book utilizes Mikhail Bahktin's literary theory as an interpretive lens. According to one reviewer, "Boase's study has opened Lamentations in new ways and in doing so has demonstrated the usefulness of new methodological approaches."  A second reviewer noted that "Boase's revised dissertation (2003, directed by Sue Boorer), is important for scholars of Lamentations, prophecy, and the interactions between them. 

Boase is one of the leading scholars at the intersection of trauma theory and biblical hermeneutics. She co-edited, with Christopher G. Frechette,  Bible through the Lens of Trauma, which was published by SBL Press in 2016, number 86 in Semeia Studies. Described as a “landmark collection of essays on the use of trauma as a hermeneutical lens in biblical studies”, this work explores how insights from the disciplines of psychology, sociology, and literary and cultural studies inform biblical trauma hermeneutics.

Boase has also written about ecological hermeneutics, and contributed to Ecological Aspects of War: Engagements with Biblical Texts, edited by Anne Elvey and Keith Dyer.  

Boase has served as co-chair of the Biblical Literature and the Hermeneutics of Trauma section for the Society of Biblical Literature. She is a member of the Fellowship of Biblical Studies. She is on the editorial board of the Journal of Biblical Literature and is the general editor of the Trauma Readings Series published by Sheffield Phoenix Press. 

The Global Church Project included Boase in its list of 20 Australian and New Zealander Female Theologians you should get to know in 2020. 

She was awarded the Gold Award for Best Theological Article by the Australasian Religious Press Association in 2013. The award was given for her article "Learning in Lament, published in New Times in October 2012.

Selected works

Books

Book chapters

Articles
  
  Access Article
 
 
  Link to Publisher version (DOI)
  Access Article
  Access Article
  Access Article
  Link to Publisher Version (DOI)

See also 
 Biblical hermeneutics

References

External links
 University of Divinity Staff Profile Page
 Flinders University Staff Profile Page
 Podcast: "What's Trauma Got to Do with the Bible?"
 
  

1963 births
Living people
Australian biblical scholars
Female biblical scholars
Murdoch University alumni
Academic staff of the University of Divinity